Antonio Florio (born 1956 in Bari, Italy) is an Italian conductor, musicologist and composer. He studied under Nino Rota, and founded the Cappella della Pietà de' Turchini in 1987 and in 2016 the Cappella Neapolitana.

References

1956 births
Living people
People from Bari
Italian male conductors (music)
Italian musicologists
Italian composers
21st-century Italian conductors (music)
21st-century Italian male musicians